Ginsburgellus novemlineatus, the Nineline goby, is a species of goby native to tropical reefs of the western Atlantic Ocean and the Caribbean Sea.  It is frequently found associated with the sea urchin Echinometra lucunter, living underneath the urchin.  This species grows to a length of  TL.  This species can also be found in the aquarium trade.  This species is the only known member of its genus, the name of which honours the ichthyologist Isaac Ginsburg (1886-1975) of the U.S. National Museum who had an interest in gobies.

References

Gobiidae
Monotypic fish genera
Fish of the Atlantic Ocean
Fish described in 1950